Help Gone Mad is a 2009 Russian tragicomedy film directed by Boris Khlebnikov.

Plot 
The film tells about a kind and lazy man who goes to Moscow to earn money. As a result of a criminal incident, he was left without money and documents. He was lucky, a good man appeared nearby and gave him the opportunity to live with him, as a result of which various funny adventures take place with them.

Cast 
 Evgeniy Sytyy as Yevgeni
 Sergey Dreyden as Engineer
 Anna Mikhalkova as Daughter
 Igor Chernevich as Godeyev
 Nikita Emshanov
 Aleksandr Gordon
 Kirill Käro
 Aleksandr Yatsenko

References

External links 
 

2009 films
2000s Russian-language films
Russian comedy films
2009 comedy films